53rd NSFC Awards
January 5, 2019

Best Film:
 The Rider 

The 53rd National Society of Film Critics Awards, given on 5 January 2019, honored the best in film for 2018.

Winners
Winners are listed in boldface along with the runner-up positions and counts from the final round:

Best Picture
 The Rider (44)
 Roma (41)
 Burning (27)

Best Director
 Alfonso Cuarón – Roma (60)
 Lee Chang-dong – Burning (22)
 Chloé Zhao – The Rider (22)

Best Actor
 Ethan Hawke – First Reformed (58)
 Willem Dafoe – At Eternity's Gate (30)
 Ben Foster – Leave No Trace (25)
 John C. Reilly – The Sisters Brothers and Stan & Ollie (25)

Best Actress
 Olivia Colman – The Favourite (36)
 Regina Hall – Support the Girls (33)
 Melissa McCarthy – Can You Ever Forgive Me? (27)

Best Supporting Actor
 Steven Yeun – Burning (40)
 Richard E. Grant – Can You Ever Forgive Me? (35)
 Brian Tyree Henry – If Beale Street Could Talk, Spider-Man: Into the Spider-Verse, and Widows (32)

Best Supporting Actress
 Regina King – If Beale Street Could Talk (47)
 Elizabeth Debicki – Widows (37)
 Emma Stone – The Favourite (24)

Best Screenplay
 Armando Iannucci, David Schneider, and Ian Martin – The Death of Stalin (47)
 Nicole Holofcener and Jeff Whitty – Can You Ever Forgive Me? (27)
 Deborah Davis and Tony McNamara – The Favourite (24)

Best Cinematography
 Alfonso Cuarón – Roma (70)
 James Laxton – If Beale Street Could Talk (26)
 Łukasz Żal – Cold War (24)

Best Foreign Language Film
 Roma – Alfonso Cuarón (44)
 Cold War – Paweł Pawlikowski (34)
 Burning – Lee Chang-dong (30)
 Shoplifters – Hirokazu Kore-eda (30)

Best Non-Fiction Film
 Minding the Gap – Bing Liu (35)
 Shirkers – Sandi Tan (31)
 Amazing Grace – Sydney Pollack (24)

Film Heritage Award
 Museum of Modern Art for restoring Ernst Lubitsch's 1923 film Rosita.
 "The team of producers, editors, restorers, technicians, and cineastes who labored for decades to bring Orson Welles's The Other Side of the Wind to completion for a new generation of movie lovers."

Special Citation
 A Family Tour, a film awaiting American distribution

References

External links
 Official website

2018 film awards
2018 in American cinema